Psalm 146 is the 146th psalm of the Book of Psalms, beginning in English in the King James Version, "Praise ye the LORD. Praise the LORD, O my soul". In Latin, it is known as "Lauda anima mea Dominum".  

In the slightly different numbering system used in the Greek Septuagint version of the Bible, and in the Latin Vulgate/Vulgata Clementina, this psalm is Psalm 145. 

Psalm 146 is used as a regular part of Jewish, Catholic, Lutheran, Anglican and other Protestant liturgies. It has often been set to music, paraphrased in hymns such as Paul Gerhardt's German "" (You my soul sing), and used in cantatas such as Bach's early  (Praise the Lord, my soul).

Text

Hebrew Bible version 
The following is the Hebrew text of Psalm 146:

King James Version 
 Praise ye the LORD. Praise the LORD, O my soul.
 While I live will I praise the LORD: I will sing praises unto my God while I have any being.
 Put not your trust in princes, nor in the son of man, in whom there is no help.
 His breath goeth forth, he returneth to his earth; in that very day his thoughts perish.
 Happy is he that hath the God of Jacob for his help, whose hope is in the LORD his God:
 Which made heaven, and earth, the sea, and all that therein is: which keepeth truth for ever:
 Which executeth judgment for the oppressed: which giveth food to the hungry. The LORD looseth the prisoners:
 The LORD openeth the eyes of the blind: the LORD raiseth them that are bowed down: the LORD loveth the righteous:
 The LORD preserveth the strangers; he relieveth the fatherless and widow: but the way of the wicked he turneth upside down.
 The LORD shall reign for ever, even thy God, O Zion, unto all generations. Praise ye the LORD.

Background 
Psalm 146 is the first of five final concluding praise Psalms in the Book of Psalms. These psalms are not attributed to David; in the Septuagint, Psalms 145 (this psalm) to 148 are given the title "of Haggai and Zechariah". Psalms 146 and 147 are seen by some as twin Psalms. Both psalms draw on images from Isaiah 61 (which Jesus takes as applying to himself in Luke 4), such as setting captives free and opening blind eyes in Psalm 147, and healing the brokenhearted in Psalm 148. Besides Isaiah 61, the themes in this Psalm are also found on Leviticus 25 (the year of Jubilee). This is one of six Psalms involving preaching to self, with the evocative phrase "O my soul" being used. Preaching to self was highly recommended by Welsh Minister Martyn Lloyd-Jones as he said "Have you realized that most of your unhappiness in life is due to the fact that you are listening to yourself instead of talking to yourself?"

Verse 2
While I live I will praise the Lord;I will sing praises to my God while I have my being.
The wording of Psalm 104:33 is "almost identical".

Uses

Judaism
The psalm in its entirety is recited during Pesukei Dezimra, the initial section of the daily morning prayer service.
The blessings Pokeiakh Ivrim ("gives sight to the blind"), Matir asurim ("releases the bound"), Zokef kefufim ("straightens the bent"), from the Birkat HaShachar are derived from Psalm 146:7-8.
Verse 10 is part of Kedusha, and is a part of the third blessing of the High Holidays Amidah.

Christianity
 Verse 6 is quoted in the New Testament in Acts ; Acts 
 Since the Middle Ages, this psalm was recited or sung during the vespers office on Thursday, according to the Rule of St. Benedict, established in 530 AD. In the modern Roman Catholic Liturgy of the Hours, Psalm 139 is recited at Vespers, and also Wednesdays in the fourth and final week of the cycle of liturgical prayers. In the liturgy of the Mass, it is played or sung for the feast of St. John the Baptist.

Musical settings 
Psalm 146 was paraphrased in Paul Gerhardt's hymn in German "" (You my soul sing), published in 1667 with a melody by Johann Georg Ebeling in the collection   (Spiritual devotions by Paul Gerhardt).

Heinrich Schütz composed a four-part setting of a metric German version for the Becker Psalter, " (My soul shall praise God the Lord), SWV 251. Johann Sebastian Bach based an early church cantata,  (Praise the Lord, my soul), on verses from the psalm. Carl Philipp Emanuel Bach included a setting for voice and in his collection of 42 psalms, Psalmen mit Melodien, H. 733, completed in 1774. The psalm is titled "Es werde Gott von uns erhoben!" (God shall be exsultet by us).

Alan Hovhaness set portions of this text, along with portions of Psalms 33 and 150, for his work Praise the Lord with Psaltery. Norma Wendelburg set the psalm to music in 1973, as Praise the Lord for mixed chorus and optional organ. Peter Heeren wrote a setting for mixed choir and piano in 2012, Der 146. Psalm.

Notes

References

External links 

 
 
 Text of Psalm 146 according to the 1928 Psalter
 Psalms Chapter 146 text in Hebrew and English, mechon-mamre.org
 Psalm 146 – Praise to the LORD, Worthy of Our Trust text and detailed commentary, enduringword.com
 Praise the LORD, my soul; I will praise the LORD all my life Text and footnotes, usccb.org United States Conference of Catholic Bishops
 Psalm 146:1 introduction and text, biblestudytools.com
 Refrain: The Lord shall reign for ever. Church of England
 Psalm 146 at biblegateway.com
Hymnary.org, Hymns for Psalm 146
 Kilnam Cha: Psalms 146-150: The Final Hallelujah Psalms   as a Fivefold Doxology to the Hebrew Psalter baylor-ir.tdl.org

146
Pesukei dezimra
Siddur of Orthodox Judaism